Jowai is one of the 60 Legislative Assembly constituencies of Meghalaya state in India. It is part of West Jaintia Hills district and is reserved for candidates belonging to the Scheduled Tribes. It falls under Shillong Lok Sabha constituency and its current MLA is Wailadmiki Shylla of National People's Party.

Members of Legislative Assembly
The list of MLAs are given below

|-style="background:#E9E9E9;"
!Year
!colspan="2" align="center"|Party
!align="center" |MLA
!Votes
|-
|1972
|bgcolor="#CEF2E0"|
|align="left"| All Party Hill Leaders Conference
|align="left"| B. B. Shallam
|2907
|-
|1978
|bgcolor="#DDDDDD"|
|align="left"| Independent
|align="left"| Tylli Kyndiah 
|2230 
|-
|1983
|bgcolor="#00FFFF"|
|align="left"| Indian National Congress
|align="left"| Roytre Christopher Laloo
|2291
|-
|1988
|bgcolor="#00FFFF"|
|align="left"| Indian National Congress
|align="left"| Roytre Christopher Laloo
|3645
|-
|1993
|bgcolor="#00FFFF"|
|align="left"| Indian National Congress
|align="left"| Roytre Christopher Laloo
|7572
|-
|1998 
|bgcolor="#CEF2E0"|
|align="left"| United Democratic Party
|align="left"| Mulieh Singh
|8775
|-
|2003
|bgcolor="#CEF2E0"|
|align="left"| United Democratic Party
|align="left"| Mulieh Singh
|8967
|-
|2008
|bgcolor="#00FFFF"|
|align="left"| Indian National Congress
|align="left"| Roytre Christopher Laloo
|7712
|-
|2013
|bgcolor="#00FFFF"|
|align="left"| Indian National Congress
|align="left"| Roytre Christopher Laloo
|9496
|-
|2018
|bgcolor="#DB7093"|
|align="left"| National People's Party
|align="left"| Wailadmiki Shylla
|10657 
|}

Election results

2023

2018

See also
List of constituencies of the Meghalaya Legislative Assembly
Jowai
Shillong (Lok Sabha constituency)
West Jaintia Hills district

References

Assembly constituencies of Meghalaya
West Jaintia Hills district